John Gruber (born 1973) is a technology blogger, UI designer, and one of the inventors of the Markdown markup language.

History
Gruber is from Philadelphia, Pennsylvania. He received his Bachelor of Science in computer science from Drexel University, then worked for Bare Bones Software (2000–02) and Joyent (2005–06). 

In 2004, Aaron Swartz and Gruber worked together to create the Markdown language, with the goal of enabling people "to write using an easy-to-read and easy-to-write plain text format, optionally convert it to structurally valid XHTML (or HTML)".

Daring Fireball

Since 2002, Gruber has written and produced Daring Fireball, a technology-focused blog. He has described his Daring Fireball writing as a "Mac column in the form of a weblog." It was partly inspired by kottke.org by Jason Kottke. The site is written in the form of a tumblelog called The Linked List, a linklog with brief commentary, in between occasional longform articles that discuss Apple products and issues in related consumer technology. Gruber often writes about user interfaces, software development, Mac applications, and Apple's media coverage.

The blog's name comes from Gruber's childhood aspiration for a career as a human cannonball stuntman act named the Daring Fireball. His costume was to be "a complete rip-off of Evel Knievel combined with the Dallas Cowboys", and the blog's logo (Unicode character U+272A ✪ "Circled White Star") references the helmet he designed for the act.

In 2004, Gruber began selling memberships, where readers donate an amount of money annually and gain access to other perks. The perks included more detailed feeds, but Gruber has downplayed the importance of the extra features, comparing them to "PBS tote bags." Daring Fireball logo T-shirts are also sold, which include a membership. 

For most of the time when Daring Fireball was a part-time project, Gruber worked as an independent web designer; between late 2005 and April 2006, Gruber's worked at Joyent where he helped with the TextDrive acquisition.

In April 2006, Daring Fireball became Gruber's full-time job, funded by advertisement revenue, membership fees, T-shirt sales, and donations from software projects also hosted on the site, such as Markdown. From 2006 to 2017, the site displayed advertisements from The Deck, an advertising network serving sites like A List Apart and 37signals in addition to Daring Fireball. In addition to this, many Amazon.com links once carried Daring Fireball's referral ID, and the site's preferences once included a choice of local Amazon store. Amazon removed Daring Fireball from their affiliate program for a violation of their terms of service.

The Talk Show
The Talk Show is a technology podcast started by Gruber intended as a "director's commentary" to Daring Fireball. Guests are usually programmers, designers, analysts and journalists. 

In June 2007, Gruber and Dan Benjamin began co-hosting an independent podcast featuring conversations and commentary on trends, mainly focusing on technology at thetalkshow.net. This format persisted but the show "started over" and helped establish Benjamin's 5by5 Studios network. The show ran from July 2010 until May 2012 for a total of 90 episodes. Gruber moved the show to the Mule Radio Syndicate network in May 2012. This time, Gruber changed the format and became the sole host of the show with alternating guests each episode. The show ran for 80 episodes and in May 2014, The Talk Show parted ways with Mule Radio and became part of Daring Fireball. The show continues to use the episode number scheme and logo started at Mule Radio.

While Gruber has remained a constant through all four iterations of the show, archives of the show's episodes are inconsistent. The initial 27 episodes that were co-hosted with Benjamin were removed by Dan in 2016. Only some of the episodes created during the time at Mule Radio remain available.

Some recurring guests include John Moltz, Marco Arment, Merlin Mann, Craig Hockenberry, John Siracusa, Rene Ritchie, Guy English, MG Siegler, Ben Thompson, Joanna Stern, Brent Simmons, Om Malik, Jason Snell, Christa Mrgan, Dave Wiskus, Matthew Panzarino, and Serenity Caldwell.

Apple Inc. senior vice president (SVP) of worldwide marketing Phil Schiller appeared as a guest on the live episode of The Talk Show during WWDC 2015 in San Francisco. Apple SVPs Eddy Cue and Craig Federighi appeared as guests on a recorded episode published February 12, 2016. Phil Schiller and Craig Federighi also appeared on the live episodes of The Talk Show during WWDC 2016 and 2017.

The Talk Show is known for its lengthy episodes. Todd Vaziri periodically updates a graph showing episode lengths.

Other works 
In early 2013, Gruber, Brent Simmons, and Dave Wiskus founded software development firm Q Branch to develop the Vesper notes app for iOS. The venture was not successful, and Q Branch has since shut down. In March 2020, Gruber started a new podcast with friend and colleague Ben Thompson called Dithering. Each episode is exactly 15 minutes long and access to the show is granted via subscription.

References

External links
Daring Fireball, 
The Talk Show, 
Markdown, 
 

1973 births
American male bloggers
American bloggers
American technology writers
Drexel University alumni
Living people
Place of birth missing (living people)
American podcasters
21st-century American non-fiction writers